Gabriel's Story is a novel by American author David Anthony Durham published by Doubleday in 2001.

Plot summary 
Durham made his literary debut with a novel which, in the tradition of Cormac McCarthy's All the Pretty Horses, views the American West through an original lens. Set in the 1870s, the novel tells the tale of Gabriel Lynch, an African American youth who settles with his family in the plains of Kansas. Dissatisfied with the drudgery of homesteading and growing increasingly disconnected from his family, Gabriel forsakes the farm for a life of higher adventure. Thus begins a forbidding trek into a terrain of austere beauty, a journey begun in hope, but soon laced with danger and propelled by a cast of brutal characters. By writing about African American characters, Durham gave voice to a population seldom included in our Western lore.

Awards and honors 
Legacy Award for Debut Fiction from the Hurston/Wright Foundation
2002 Alex Award from the American Library Association
2001 First Novel Award from the Black Caucus of the American Library Association
The New York Times Notable Book
Los Angeles Times and Publishers Weekly Best of 2001
Booklist Editor's Choice
Book club pick for The Washington Post and The Kansas City Star.
For reviews see: USA Today (January 18, 2001), San Francisco Chronicle (January 28, 2001), Time (February 12, 2001), The New York Times Book Review (February 25, 2001), and All Things Considered  (March 2001).
Gabriel's Story has been optioned by Uberto Pasolini and is in development for a feature film with Alan Taylor to direct.

External links 
 
 New York Times review of Gabriel's Story

Western United States
American historical novels
Doubleday (publisher) books
2001 novels
Novels set in the 1870s
Novels set in Kansas